This is a list for all the individuals that Pope Benedict XV (r. 1914–22) beatified throughout his pontificate; the pope beatified 46 individuals in total.

See also
 List of people beatified by Pope Pius X
 List of people beatified by Pope Pius XI
 List of people beatified by Pope Pius XII
 List of people beatified by Pope John XXIII
 List of people beatified by Pope Paul VI
 List of people beatified by Pope John Paul II
 List of people beatified by Pope Benedict XVI
 List of people beatified by Pope Francis

Beatified by Pope Benedict XV
Beatified by Pope Benedict XV

Benedict XV
Pope Benedict XV